Naroa is a village in Goa, India, approximately 35 kilometres from Panjim. It is the site of Saptakoteshwar Temple.

Villages in North Goa district